Sally Bollywood: Super Detective (known as simply Sally Bollywood) is an animated television show co-produced by the French company Tele Images Kids and by Australia's Three's a Company. The series was originally broadcast on France 3 in France and on Seven Network in Australia. Two series have been produced, each consisting of 52 13-minute episodes. Many networks air episodes in pairs, to fill a half-hour time slot.

Overview 
The series revolves around Sally, a young 12 year-old Indian girl who lives in the city of Cosmopolis, where people of different nationalities and ethnic groups make up the population. Her father, Harry Bollywood, is a private detective, which has inspired Sally to start her own investigative service, Sally Bollywood Investigations (SBI), located in the basement of their home. Sally and her best friend Doowee McAdam generally investigate cases brought to them by their schoolmates by travelling around their local neighbourhood, with Sally using her skills of deduction and Doowee using technology he invents.

Production 
The series was developed in association with France 3 and Seven Network. It is co-produced by France Télévisions in France and Three's a Company in Australia, and distributed internationally by Zodiak Entertainment Distribution.

Characters

Main

Current SBI members
 Sally Bollywood: An Indian girl detective. She investigates primarily by asking people questions. She has purple plum hair. She speaks with an Australian accent in the English dub. She's also a huge fan of the Fuzzy Frogs. She lives in Cosmopolis. 
 Doowee MacAdam: A boy who is Sally's best friend. He assists Sally with her investigations, often by using technology invented by himself. He has red hair. He also likes the Fuzzy Frogs. He of Irish descent.

Former SBI members
 Jasmine Gupta: A girl who used to be the SBI's intern but got kicked out when she sorted Sally's papers incorrectly. She is snobbish and narcissistic. She is Rahani's sister and Alma is her best friend.

Supporting

Sally's parents
 Harry Bollywood: Sally's father, a private detective who inspired Sally to begin her own investigation service. He often worries about Sally taking on cases, but is honored that she has chosen to follow in his footsteps. He also has purple hair.
 Mrs. Apu: An older woman who is a friend of Harry. She acts as the Bollywoods' housekeeper and often offers advice to Sally, Doowee and other characters. She's sort of a mother figure for Sally. She also loves cooking and enjoys experimenting with new recipes.

Sally Bollywood's friends
This is a list of Sally's friends and classmates. Some have formed groups and clubs.

The Fuzzy Frogs
The Fuzzy Frogs is a school rock band. They used to be a boy band until the frogs realized how much Jenny wanted to be a member. The group makes rock music and has a huge following of mostly girls (although Doowee is a fan too). Groupies often mob them.

The following are current Fuzzy Frogs members:
 Tommy: Julie's brother
 Jeremy: The leader of the band
 Max
 Vanessa: A very good singer and participater in the school concert. She became a star within the school. Her stage name is Vanessa M.

Other recurring characters
 Lee: A boy and classmate of Sally and Doowee. His mother is a herbalist and owns a shop. After he was found sabotaging a swimming competition, Sally and Doowee discovered that Lee has six toes on each foot rather than five. Ironically, he ended up winning that swimming contest.
 Luna: Used to claim she was a sorceress and has an uncanny fascination of the spirit world. She also writes horror stories.
 Melody: One of Vanessa's best friends, Melody is a singer like Vanessa. However, her reputation was marred by the fact that she used autotune during performances.
 Christina: Melody's best friend, Christina helps produce and prepare Melody's stage for live performances, acting as her personal assistant.
 Bridget Brickhouse: A girl best known in athletics. She's exceptionally strong, once even throwing Doowee onto a gym mat. However, she's very quick-tempered and also has terrible grades.
 Albert: A scientist, like Doowee, he often rivals him in science contests. Both he and Albert created particle analyzers. Albert also is of German ancestry and lisps.
 Mr. Bobby Shoebridge: A principal of Little Bombay Junior High. He gives Sally and Doowee tasks when things are going on around the school.
 Paul: A boy who writes poetry and aspires to become a rapper. He also loves gold and idolizes rappers.
 Anna: A shy girl who loves blue. She wears blue clothes, has blue shoes and even has a blue bookbag.
 Achmed: An expert skateboarder and master of disguise.
 Nirmala Pashimbrana: An extremely shy friend of Sally and Doowee. She also is so generous she never turns down a favor, and is very agile, as well as being quite a good dancer.
 Rahani Gupta: Jasmine's brother, and a lover of art. He once flirted with Christina, and it is rumored that they are or were in a relationship. He's also Sanjay's brother. Rahani is a really good cook too.
 Alma: A girl who is best friends with Jasmine and is also known for being extremely excitable. Sometimes, though, she can have a fierce temper, be rude and snobbish.
 Mr. Big: A former con man who also is a fortune teller. He later revealed to the SBI, though, that he simply tells his clients "what they want to hear." He is not very big.
 Stan: An eccentric boy who has weird tastes. He was revealed to have a pet rat and be the person behind internet phenomenon Blogger Boy, a popular blogger. He lets his little sister Ann borrow him whenever she wants.
 George: A popular boy. He has bad grades. Sally once had a crush on him. George also likes to garden. He is the older brother of Betty, and the two appear to be very close. He has black hair with a purple patch.
 Betty: A shy girl with black hair nearly covering her eyes. She becomes Sally and Dowee's friend after they help her with an investigation. She is the younger sister of George, and the two appear to be very close. Betty gets upset when faced with the threat of her brother transferring schools.
 Jaya Madurpore: The daughter of Mrs. Madurpore, Jaya is a smart student who comes to the SBI after losing her 'lucky charm'. She is shown to be a bit bossy and has green hair and green eyes.
 Indira Madurpore (née Kooptur) a.k.a. Mrs. Madurpore: A biology teacher at Sally and Dowee's school. She is the mother of Jaya and is shown to be quite strict at times. She has very dark green hair.
 Cassie: A girl who moved to the neighborhood. She once lied about having a cat hoping to gain friends, but Sally blows her cover. Luckily, Naomi showed sympathy for her. She can be bossy at times, but usually gets along with other people. She also has pink hair with clips.

Episodes

Season 1 (2009–11)

Season 2
1.Rock n Roll Dad

2.Comic Book Caper

3.Performing Magic

4.New Teacher

5.The Sorceress

6.Muckraking

7.Poster Boy

8.Exchange Student

9.The Crystal Guitar

10.Ancient History

11.Night At The Museum

12.The Sad Clown Gang

13.Everyone's Private Eye

14.Burglary 2.0

15.The Black Sheep

16.The Haunted House

17.The Big Stink

18.Storm Clouds over the SBI

19.Adventures in Pet Sitting

20.Crime flash

21.Missing Mobiles

22.Eye in the Sky

23.Whodunnit

24.Stolen Clothes

25.Singing & Dancing Sally

26.Sally's Circus

27.Camp of Doom

28.A Bird in the Hand

29.Detention

30.Serial Treachery

31.Starry Eyed

32.Miss Mystery

33.Pyjama Party

34.Sally's Pen Pal

35.Too Many Cooks

36.The White Knight

37.Fangs a Lot

38.Ripped off Rapp

39.Party Pooper

40.Doowee's Urn

41.Beauty Pageant

42.Ring my Bell

43.Catch Me If You Can

44.The Invincible Rider

45.Dinosaur Danger

46.New Girl

47.All Made Up

48.Asphalt Jungle

49.Birthday Surprise

50.Champion

51.Hot Potatoes

52.Fundraising Felony

See also 
 Mira, Royal Detective

References

External links 
 Sally Bollywood at ABC3
 

2010 Australian television series debuts
2013 Australian television series endings
2010s Australian animated television series
2010s French animated television series
Australian children's animated comedy television series
Australian children's animated fantasy television series
Australian children's animated mystery television series
Australian flash animated television series
Anime-influenced Western animated television series
Animated detective television series
Animated television series about children
Animated television series about robots
Bollywood in fiction
Cultural depictions of Indian women
English-language television shows
French children's animated comedy television series
French children's animated fantasy television series
French children's animated mystery television series
French flash animated television series
French-language television shows
Seven Network original programming
Television series by Banijay
Fictional amateur detectives
Fictional traceurs and freerunners
French-Australian culture
Kalarippayattu films